Gianni Toti (Rome, 24 June 1924 - Rome, 8 January 2007) was an Italian poet, writer, journalist, and cineaste. In the early 80s he created "Poetronica" (poetry and cinema elaborated with electronic art).

Biography

Graduated in Law, he published poetry books, articles and novels. He was partisan against Nazism and Fascism in the Italian Resistenza and, for many years, journalist and correspondent for the political newspaper L’Unità. Editor-in-chief of "La voce della Sicilia", "Lavoro", and of the cultural review "Carte segrete".

In the early 80s he began an experimentation where he mixed poetry, cinema and electronic art, creating a new language, which he defined "poetronica" (video poetry and electronic poetry). By realizing his works he collaborated with specialized cultural centers, such as CICV (Centre de Recherche Pierre Schaeffer, in Montbéliard-Belfort, France), that gave him the possibility to utilize technologies and equips of technicians for creating artistic projects.

In his works Toti mixes history, politics, legends, oral traditions, folk culture. His writing contains idiomatic expressions, neologisms, words taken from many languages.

Film and Video Poem Opera

Film
Ciné-tracts, cortissimimetraggi, Parigi-Roma 1968-1969
Chi ha paura della Cecoslovacchia, 1969, Unitelefilm, Roma
Cinegiornaliberi, cortometraggi (con Cesare Zavattini), 1968–69
Lenin vivo, mediometraggio, Unitelefilm, Roma 1970
E di Shaùl e dei sicari sulle vie da Damasco, lungometraggio 35mm. 1973, 119', Italia-Siria
Alice nel paese delle cartaviglie, mediometraggio, 1980

Video
La vita quotidiana durante la seconda guerra mondiale, 1980 50', Rai-DSE
Per una videopoesia, 1980, 80', Rai-Ricerca e sperimentazione programmi
Tre videopoemetti, 1981, 33' Rai-Ricerca e sperimentazione programmi
"Trilogia majakovskiana": Valeriascopia, 26';
Incatenata alla pellicola, 60';
Cuor di Tèlema, 83', 1982–83, Rai-Ricerca e sperimentazione programmi
"L'immaginario scientifico": L'arnia cosmica, 9';
Alla ricerca dell'anticoda, 14';
I raggi cosmici e l'odoscopio, 4'45";
Dialogo digitale del corpo umano, 27';
L'ordine, il caos, il phaos, 24'30";
La terra vista dal cielo, 5';
Conversazione sulle grandi sintesi, 50', 1986,
Cité de la Science et de l'Industrie, La Villette, Paris
SqueeZangeZaùm, 1988, 100', Rai-Istituto Luce. Dedicated to Velimir Khlebnikov (Gold Laser Award, Locarno, 1988)
Terminale Intelligenza, 1990, 60', Università degli Studi, Pisa
Monteveritazione op. 000?, 1991, 17', Festival Videoart Locarno
Tenez Tennis, 1992, 15', Rai Lombardia, Università degli Studi, Bologna, Etabeta, Roma. For Valeria Magli's ballet with music by John Cage
Planetopolis, 1994, 126', CICV-Centre International de Création Vidéo Montbéliard-Belfort
L'origInédite, 1994, 18', Atélier Brouillard Précis, Marseille
Tupac Amauta-premier chant, 1997, 53', CICV Montbéliard-Belfort. Trilogy inspired to Tupac Amaru, Inca king murdered in 1572 by the conquistadores, and to Tupac Amaru II, who fought against the Conquest with his Quechua Indians (with the collaboration of José-Carlos Mariátegui, Elisa Zurlo)
Acà Nada, 1998, 27', PRIM, Montréal, Canada.
Gramsciategui ou les poesimistes-deuxième cri, 1999, 55', CICV Montbéliard-Belfort
Trionfo della morte et mort sans triomphe avec danses macabres, 2002, 23', CICV Montbéliard-Belfort

Other works

Novels
 Gianni Toti, L'altra fame, novel, Milano, Rizzoli, 1970
 Gianni Toti, Il padrone assoluto, novel, Milano, Feltrinelli, 1977

Poetry books
Among his numerous poetry books we remember:
 Gianni Toti, Che c'è di nuovo, Premio Rapallo 1962
 Gianni Toti, L’uomo scritto, poems, Sciascia, 1961
 Gianni Toti, La coscienza infelice, poems, Guanda, 1966
 Gianni Toti, Penultime dall’al di qua, poems, Sciascia, 1969
 Gianni Toti, Per il paroletariato o della poesicipazione, Umbria Editrice, 1977
 Gianni Toti, Tre ucronie, 1970
 Gianni Toti, Chiamiamola poemetànoia, 1974
 Gianni Toti, Il leggibile figlio di Jakob, poems, Il Bagatto, 1984
 Gianni Toti, Strani attrattori, poems, Empiria, 1986
 Gianni Toti, La bellezza dell'enigma, Carlo Mancosu Publisher, collection of books + sound cassette, Roma 1992

Prose
 Gianni Toti, Tredici irracconti dell’anagnoste, prose, Artificina, 1981
 Gianni Toti, Racconti di palpebra, prose, Empiria, 1989

Theater
 Poesia e no (Piccolo Teatro di Livorno, 1965)
 La penultima caccia allo snualo (Pestival Santa Croce sull’Arno, 1985) Essays:
 Gianni Toti, Il tempo libero, Editori Riuniti, 1961,
 Gianni Toti, Erotismo, eversione, merce, Cappelli, 1974
 Gianni Toti, Mostri al microscopio, Marsilio, 1980

Collections
Director of poetry collections:
"Sintagma", Sciascia Publisher
"Officina di poesia", Edizioni dell'Ateneo

See also

 Electronic art
 Digital Poetry
 Video art
 Computer art
 Futurism
 Russian Futurism

References
"Immagine & Pubblico. Video", numero speciale dedicato alla Videoarte, a cura di Marco Maria Gazzano e Gianni Toti, suppl. n. 2/3, aprile - settembre, Ente Autonomo Gestione Cinema, Roma (I) 1990
"Immagine & Pubblico. Arti elettroniche", numero monografico, a cura di Marco Maria Gazzano e Gianni Toti, a.IX, n.1, gennaio-marzo, Ente Autonomo Gestione Cinema, Roma 1991
"Tendenze. Videoarte e cinema elettronico", in "Cinema d'Oggi", quindicinale di informazioni cinematografiche, audiovisive, tecniche e multimediali dell'ANICA, Roma (1997–1999)
"Gianni Toti. Il tempo del senso", in "Internet Catalogue", XVIII VideoArt Festival, Locarno (CH) 1997
"Poietica cinematografica e cinegrafia elettronica in Gianni Toti", in Catalogo de "L'immagine leggera. Videoart + Film + Media Festival", Comune di Palermo, Palermo 1997
Caterina Davinio, Tecno-Poesia e realtà virtuali (Techno-Poetry and Virtual Realities), Mantova (I), Sometti, 2002
Sandra Lischi, "Gli ottantaToti. Piccolissimo viaggio a ritroso negli ottanta(mila) universi del "poetronico" Gianni Toti" in Stati Liquidi. Invideo, video d'arte e cinema oltre, pp. 27–32, Simonetta Cargioli e Sandra Lischi, 2004
Sandra Lischi, "Elettronica, videoarte e poetronica" in Storia del cinema italiano, 1977–1985, pp. 457–471, Vito Zagarrio, 2005
Ander Gondra (Ed.), "Gianni Toti. La creación total", Barcelona: Sans Soleil Ediciones 
Sandra Lisch & Silvia Moretti, "Gianni Toti o della poetronica", Edizioni ETS, 2012.

External links
 La Casa Totiana
 Gianni Toti's text (1993)
  it
  it
 interview it
 Gianni Toti, information in Spanish by ATA

Italian male poets
Writers from Rome
1924 births
2007 deaths
20th-century Italian poets
20th-century Italian male writers
Electronic literature writers